Angelo I Gozzadini (died between 1468 and 1476) was Lord of Kythnos.

He married in 1429 Caterina Crispo (born 1415, date of death unknown), daughter of Nicholas Crispo, Lord of Syros and sister of Francesco II, sixteenth Duke of the Archipelago.

References

 

1464 deaths
People from the Duchy of the Archipelago
People from the Cyclades
Year of birth unknown
Kythnos
Lords of the Crusader states
15th-century Italian nobility